Paul Jarvie (born 19 October 1952) is an Australian former swimmer. He competed at the 1972 Summer Olympics and the 1976 Summer Olympics.

References

External links
 

1952 births
Living people
Australian male breaststroke swimmers
Olympic swimmers of Australia
Swimmers at the 1972 Summer Olympics
Swimmers at the 1976 Summer Olympics
Commonwealth Games medallists in swimming
Commonwealth Games silver medallists for Australia
Commonwealth Games bronze medallists for Australia
Swimmers at the 1970 British Commonwealth Games
Place of birth missing (living people)
20th-century Australian people
Medallists at the 1970 British Commonwealth Games